Marple Junction is the name of the canal junction where the Macclesfield Canal terminates and meets the Peak Forest Canal at Marple, Greater Manchester, England.

The water of the two canal companies was kept apart by a stop lock in the narrows at the end of the later Macclesfield Canal, but this has long since been de-gated and the two canals run at the same level.

History
The Peak Forest Canal was authorised by an Act of Parliament obtained in 1794, which was designed to access the limestone deposits at Doveholes, near Whaley Bridge. Most of the canal opened in 1800, but the locks were not completed until 1804 and a second tramway was used to bypass the locks until they were ready.

Although a route through Macclesfield to connect the Trent and Mersey Canal to Manchester had been suggested as early as 1777, an Act of Parliament was not obtained until 1826, following a survey by Thomas Telford. The junction with the Peak Forest Canal is just above the top lock of the Marple flight.

The limestone traffic on the upper Peak Forest Canal ceased in 1922 and the upper section gradually became unusable. The lower canal was also disused by 1939. Following determined efforts by the Peak Forest Canal Society, the Inland Waterways Association, the British Waterways Board and the local authorities (through whose regions the canals ran), both the Peak Forest and Ashton Canals were reopened in 1974; this provided Marple Junction with its connection to the national network. With the reopening, the junction was again operational.

Location
The top lock of the Marple flight is immediately to the north of the junction. The Macclesfield Canal initially heads south-west before turning to the south. A footbridge carries the towpath from the west bank of the Peak Forest Canal to the south bank by the junction, but it very quickly crosses back to the western bank of the Macclesfield Canal at Church Lane Bridge. The whole of the canal is a designated conservation area, following action by Macclesfield Borough Council in June 1975, as a response to a policy document entitled Recreational Framework for Britain's Canals.

See also

Canals of the United Kingdom
History of the British canal system

Bibliography

References

Canal junctions in England
Canals in the Metropolitan Borough of Stockport
Macclesfield Canal
Canals opened in 1831
Marple, Greater Manchester